Anna Juppe (born 14 September 1999) is an Austrian biathlete. She competed at the  2022 Winter Olympics, in Women's individual, and Women's relay. She competed at the 2021–22 Biathlon World Cup.

References

External links

1999 births
Living people
Austrian female cross-country skiers
Austrian female biathletes
Biathletes at the 2022 Winter Olympics
Olympic biathletes of Austria
Cross-country skiers at the 2016 Winter Youth Olympics